The 2009–10 Lega Pro Seconda Divisione season was the thirty-second football league season of Italian Lega Pro Seconda Divisione since its establishment in 1978, and the second since the renaming from Serie C to Lega Pro.

It was divided into two phases: the regular season, played from September 2009 to May 2010, and the playoff phase from May to June 2010.

The league was composed of 54 teams divided into three divisions of 18 teams each, whose teams were divided geographically.  Teams played only other teams in their own division, once at home and once away for a total of 34 matches each.

Teams that finished first in the regular season, plus one team winning the playoff round from each division were promoted to Lega Pro Prima Divisione; teams that finished last in the regular season, plus two relegation playoff losers from each division were relegated to Serie D.  In all, six teams were promoted to Prima Divisione, and nine teams were relegated to Serie D.

Events

Start of season

On July 9, the Covisoc (Commissione di Vigilanza sulle Società Calcistiche, Vigilancy Commission on Football Clubs) organization announced that 11 Seconda Divisione clubs did not pass the financial requirements in order to be admitted to the league.  The clubs were allowed to appeal the decision until July 11.  Seven were eventually saved.  Of the remaining four, two did not bother to file submissions even before the review started, one did not appeal Covisoc's decision, while the fourth team lost on appeal.

The league was to feature six teams relegated from 2008–09 Lega Pro Prima Divisione: Pro Sesto, Sambenedettese, Legnano, Pistoiese, 
Juve Stabia, and Potenza.  Three vacancies were created from this group.  Two teams were excluded from the 2009–10 season as they did not pass the financial requirements: Sambenedettese did not appeal the commission's decision, while Pistoiese lost on appeal.  On July 30, Potenza was called up to Prima Divisione to fill a vacancy.

It was to feature nine teams promoted from 2008–09 Serie D as division winners: Biellese (that did not file any registration papers, and thus, was excluded from the league and replaced by Spezia) - Girone A, P.B. Vercelli - Girone B, Sacilese - Girone C, Crociati Noceto - Girone D, Sporting Lucchese - Girone E, Pro Vasto - Girone F, Villacidrese - Girone G, Brindisi - Girone H, and Siracusa - Girone I.

The remaining 39 teams were to come from the group of teams that played in 2008–09 Lega Pro Seconda Divisione that were neither relegated nor promoted.  Another four vacancies were created from this group.  Ivrea (9th in Girone A) failed to register for the upcoming season.  Alessandria - 2nd in Girone A, Andria - 5th in Girone C, and  Viareggio - 2nd in Girone B - all promotional playoff losers in the Second Divisione 2008–09 season were called up to Prima Divisione anyway to fill vacancies.

The eight vacancies were successively filled as follows:
 Spezia - 2nd in 2008–09 Serie D - Girone A, replacing first place Biellese
 Nocerina - 2nd in 2008–09 Serie D - Girone H, winner of the playoffs
 Vico Equense - 2nd in 2008–09 Serie D - Girone I, finalist in the playoffs
 Fano - 2nd in 2008–09 Serie D - Girone F, selected by the league
 FeralpiSalò - 4th in 2008–09 Serie D(as A.C. Salò) - Girone D, selected by the league
 Valenzana - 16th in 2008–09 Lega Pro Seconda Divisione - Girone A, originally relegated for losing in the playouts.
 Poggibonsi - 15th in 2008–09 Lega Pro Seconda Divisione - Girone B, originally relegated for losing in the playouts.
 Isola Liri - 17th in 2008–09 Lega Pro Seconda Divisione - Girone C, originally relegated for losing in the playouts.

Teams

Girone A

Girone B

Girone C

League table

Girone A

Girone B

Girone C

Promotion Playoffs

Girone A

Semifinals
First legs played May 23, 2010; return legs played May 30, 2010

Final
First leg played June 6, 2010; return leg played June 13, 2010

Spezia promoted to Lega Pro Prima Divisione.

Girone B

Semifinals
First legs played May 23, 2010; return legs played May 30, 2010

Final
First leg played June 6, 2010; return leg played June 13, 2010

Gubbio promoted to Lega Pro Prima Divisione.

Girone C

Semifinals
First legs played May 23, 2010; return legs played May 30, 2010

hc - higher classified team wins

Final
First leg played June 6, 2010; return leg played June 13, 2010

Cisco Roma promoted to Lega Pro Prima Divisione.

Relegation Playoffs

Girone A

First legs played May 23, 2010; return legs played May 30, 2010

hc - higher classified team wins

P.B. Vercelli and Carpenedolo relegated to Serie D.

Girone B

First legs played May 23, 2010; return legs played May 30, 2010

hc - higher classified team wins

Colligiana and Bellaria Igea relegated to Serie D.

Girone C

First legs played May 23, 2010; return legs played May 30, 2010

hc - higher classified team wins

Vico Equense and Noicattaro relegated to Serie D.

References

Lega Pro Seconda Divisione seasons
Italy
4